Grupo Bandeirantes de Comunicação (commonly referred only as Grupo Bandeirantes or Bandeirantes) is a Brazilian media conglomerate founded on the creation of the first group communication vehicle, Rádio Bandeirantes, on May 6, 1937.

Companies

Broadcasting

Free-to-air television 
 Band TV — broadcast television network with national coverage.
 Rede 21 — broadcast television network, broadcasting the programming of its leaseholder, the Universal Church of the Kingdom of God.
 TV Terra Viva — free-to-air satellite television channel about agrobusiness.

Subscription channels 
 Arte 1 — channel about art and culture.
 BandNews TV — rolling news channel.
 BandSports — sports channel.
 Band Internacional — channel oriented for Brazilian public who lives outside Brazil.
 Sexprivé —  adult content channel, partnership with Brasileirinhas.
 S&A — female content channel.

Radio networks 
 Band FM — popular music radio network.
 BandNews FM — all news radio network.
 Rádio Bandeirantes — news talk radio network.
 Bradesco Esportes FM — sport radio network with naming rights from bank Bradesco.
 Nativa FM — popular music radio network, joint venture with Grupo Camargo de Comunicação.

Independent stations 
 Band Vale FM — radio station from Taubaté, São Paulo, with music and news programming.
 Brasil Radio (WRSO) — radio station from Orlando, Florida, United States, which broadcasts the programming of the Grupo Bandeirantes radio networks in partnership with Cafifa Media Group.
 Educadora FM — radio station to provide programs for young people located in Campinas.
 MPB Brasil — radio station with a música popular brasileira programming at Rio de Janeiro city.
 Rádio Trânsito — radio station with traffic information from Greater São Paulo.

Print media 
 Metro Brasil — free distribution newspaper, result of a joint-venture with Metro International.
 Primeiramão — classified ads newspaper.

Digital media 
 Band.com.br — web portal which houses all the company's sites, hosted by UOL.
 Ipanema FM — rock web radio station.
 One Brasil — interactive media company.

Out-of-home 
 Otima — joint-venture with Odebrecht, Kalítera Engenharia e APMR Investimentos e Participações, responsible for urban furniture of the bus stops in São Paulo city.
 Outernet — main out-of-home company of the group, which operates with several other companies.
 Mão Dupla — out of home company that works with static media the bus lines in the city of São Paulo.
 Modern Airport — out of home company that operates in the São Paulo–Guarulhos International Airport.
 Nextmídia — out of home company that operates in bus terminals.
 Orla TV —  out of home company that operates in kiosks on the shores of the Rio de Janeiro beaches.
 TVO — out of home company that operates in bus lines in the city of São Paulo.
 TV Minuto — out of home company that operates in the lines 1-Blue, 2-Green and 3-Red of São Paulo Metro.

Other companies 
 Band Content Distribution — content distribution company.
 Band Music — record company.
 Enter — events promoter company.
 payleven — online payment company. (merged with SumUp)
 TkT1 — ticket sales.

Notes

References

External links 
 

 
Mass media companies of Brazil
Mass media companies established in 1937
Companies based in São Paulo
Privately held companies of Brazil
1937 establishments in Brazil